Milan "Mile" Jovin (Serbian Cyrillic: Милан Joвин ;born December 13, 1955) is a Serbian former football player and manager. 

As a player, he got 4 caps for Yugoslavia. He spent eight years playing for Red Star Belgrade.

As a manager, he won the Premier League of Bosnia and Herzegovina with FK Leotar in the 2002–03 season.

Honours

Player
Red Star Belgrade
Yugoslav First League: 1979–80, 1980–81, 1983–84
Yugoslav Cup: 1981–82, 1984–85

Manager
Leotar
Bosnian Premier League: 2002–03
Republika Srpska Cup: 2003–04

References

External links
Profile on Serbian federation official site

1955 births
Living people
Serbian footballers
Yugoslav footballers
Yugoslavia international footballers
Association football defenders
Yugoslav First League players
FK Vojvodina players
Red Star Belgrade footballers
Red Star Belgrade non-playing staff
Degerfors IF players
Olympic footballers of Yugoslavia
Footballers at the 1980 Summer Olympics
Serbian expatriate footballers
Expatriate footballers in Sweden
Serbian football managers
Serbian expatriate football managers
Expatriate football managers in Bosnia and Herzegovina
Premier League of Bosnia and Herzegovina managers
FK Leotar managers